Zwola  is a village in the administrative district of Gmina Zaniemyśl, within Środa Wielkopolska County, Greater Poland Voivodeship, in west-central Poland.

The village has a population of 130.

References

Zwola